São Pedro de Penaferrim is a former civil parish in the municipality of Sintra, Lisbon District, Portugal. In 2013, the parish merged into the new parish Sintra (Santa Maria e São Miguel, São Martinho e São Pedro de Penaferrim). The population in 2011 was 14,001, in an area of 26.97 km2. Many of the town of Sintra's historical monuments are located in São Pedro de Penaferrim, including the Pena Palace and 
the Castle of the Moors.

References

Former parishes of Sintra